Riders to the Sea is a British short film, shot in 1935 in Ireland. It is based on 1904 play of the same name, written by John Millington Synge. It was directed by Brian Desmond Hurst with Sara Allgood and Denis Johnston in the title roles.

Plot
A story set in a fishing community in Western Ireland. It concerns Maurya, a woman who loses her husband and her sons at the sea.

Cast
Sara Allgood as Maurya
Denis Johnston as Michael
Kevin Guthrie as Bartley
Ria Mooney as Cathleen
Shelah Richards as Nora
Brigit Laffey

Production notes
 The film was shot in 1935 in Connemara, County Galway.

Critical response
Writing for The Spectator in 1935, Graham Greene praised Fields for her courage and generosity in financing this independent film, however he faulted the film's apparent independence from the viewer, and described the film as "altogether too private" in its presentation. Greene (who admitted a personal disinclination toward Synge's plays) predicted that even Synge's admirers would struggle with the film and suggested that "something has gone badly wrong with the continuity; the loss of act divisions has upset the sense of time".

References

External links

Riders to the Sea website dedicated to Brian Desmond Hurst
 Riders to the Sea in a website dedicated to Gracie Fields
Full restored film at YouTube

1936 films
1936 short films
British films based on plays
Films set in Ireland
Films shot in County Galway
British black-and-white films
Films with screenplays by Patrick Kirwan
Films directed by Brian Desmond Hurst